Glyphipterix maschalis is a species of sedge moth in the genus Glyphipterix. It was described by Edward Meyrick in 1909. It is found in Sri Lanka.

References

Moths described in 1909
Glyphipterigidae
Moths of Sri Lanka